Robert Wesley Hilton (born July 23, 1943) is an American television game show personality. He hosted The Guinness Game, a revival of Truth or Consequences, and the 1990 revival of Let's Make a Deal for one season and replaced by Monty Hall, and announced on several other shows.

Biography
Born in Lake Charles, Louisiana, Hilton has announced numerous game shows, such as Card Sharks; Child's Play; Trivia Trap; The $25,000 Pyramid; The $100,000 Pyramid; Blockbusters; Double Talk; The New Newlywed Game; The All-New Dating Game; Strike It Rich; Win, Lose or Draw; and Body Language. His first game show announcing assignment was in 1980 on Tic-Tac-Dough (filling in for regular announcer Jay Stewart), followed by The Joker's Wild and Play the Percentages, after he began a contract with Barry & Enright Productions, that same year. Hilton also announced The Price Is Right following the death of its original announcer, Johnny Olson. According to former producer Roger Dobkowitz, he did extremely well. However, Hilton was already working on several other shows at the time, so the job was given to Rod Roddy.

Hilton's non-game show announcing work included the 1988 CBS specials Live! Dick Clark Presents and the ABC daytime program Home in the early 1990's.

Hilton got his start in Louisiana at station KPLC-TV. He traveled around to various stations as news anchor/reporter, such as in Honolulu, Hawaii, KTRK-TV in Houston, KGAN-TV in Cedar Rapids, WNAC-TV in Boston (The Bob Hilton Show), and KHJ-TV in Los Angeles. He later went on to KOVR in Sacramento, California.

Hilton is a Latter-day Saint. On one occasion he turned down a show because he felt it tended too much towards sexual arousal.

Wife
Hilton is married to the former Joni Pennock. She was Miss California USA in 1976. She has also been a TV talk show host. More recently she has written 23 books, many of them novels with explicitly Mormon characters and themes, such as As the Ward Turns. She has also worked as a magazine correspondent and writer to the Mormon Tabernacle Choir program Music and the Spoken Word. Joni is also a playwright.

Family

Hilton and his wife have four children: Richie, Brandon, Cassidy, and Nicole.

Hilton retired from the entertainment world following the creation of a cleaning products company called Holy Cow, selling nationwide through major retailers. After selling the Holy Cow company, in 2011, Hilton co-founded a new company, NovaGreenWorld, an environmental products supplier for commercial and industrial companies as well as municipalities.

References

External links

Holy Cow Products

1943 births
American game show hosts
Latter Day Saints from California
Game show announcers
Let's Make a Deal
Living people
People from Lake Charles, Louisiana
Latter Day Saints from Louisiana